DWLV (91.9 FM), broadcasting as 91.9 BBS FM, is a radio station owned and operated by Bicol Broadcasting System. The station's studio and transmitter are located at the BBS Bldg., Balatas Rd., Brgy. Balatas, Naga, Camarines Sur.

The station was established in 2004 as Mixx FM airing a mass-based format, with news and talk in the morning. In 2015, it rebranded as BBS FM and switched to a classic hits format, albeit retaining its news and talk programming.

References

Radio stations in Naga, Camarines Sur
Radio stations established in 2004